The Adelaide International Bird Sanctuary National Park—Winaityinaityi Pangkara is a protected area in South Australia established by the South Australian government on the northeast coast of Gulf St Vincent, between Parham in the north and the southern end of Barker Inlet (part of the Port River estuary) in the south, for the purpose of rehabilitating land used as salt pans, protecting habitat for international migratory shorebirds, managing water quality in adjoining parts of Gulf St Vincent, creation of "green" space, development of niche tourism and creation of opportunities for Indigenous people.

This very low-gradient, low-energy coastline, containing a broad lateral extent of subtidal seagrass meadows, intertidal mangroves and supratidal saltmarshes and salinas, extends from the Adelaide metropolitan area as far as the head of Gulf St Vincent, and is also known as the "Samphire Coast". The coastline north of Parham, outside the proposed sanctuary, also has a high degree of protection through being in the Port Wakefield Proof and Experimental Establishment, and the Clinton Conservation Park.

Key objectives 
The Adelaide International Bird Sanctuary is a protected area established by the SA government for the northeast coast of Gulf St Vincent extending from Adelaide to its immediate north with the view of achieving the five key outcomes:
Protection of habitat particularly used by shorebirds that migrate over large extents of the Earth's surface.
Management of water quality in Gulf St Vincent particularly in respect to stormwater and wastewater produced in the northern suburbs of Adelaide and its treatment prior to release into Gulf St Vincent.
Creation of 'green' space 'on the fringes of the northern Adelaide Plains that will allow stormwater recycling, absorb carbon dioxide and enhance the amenity and attractiveness of the region'.
Tourism development that 'provide opportunities for developing exclusive, high-end tourism experiences with a focus on national and international birdwatchers'.
Indigenous involvement via measures to 'employ and engage Aboriginal people and use Indigenous knowledge to develop and implement environmental and cultural heritage education and interpretation programs.'
A driver for the proposal is the need to rehabilitate land previously used at Dry Creek, St Kilda and other localities as salt pans and managing the environmental risks arising from the cessation of salt evaporation process of salt extract such as exposing of acid sulphate soils.

Extent 
Its extent overlaps and adjoins existing protected areas such as the Port Gawler and Torrens Island conservation parks, the Upper Gulf St Vincent Marine Park, the Barker Inlet-St Kilda Aquatic Reserve, the St Kilda – Chapman Creek Aquatic Reserve and the Adelaide Dolphin Sanctuary.

The sanctuary also includes  of land that adjoins the Port Gawler Conservation Park and Buckland Park lake, which was purchased in 2013 by the SA government with financial contributions from Nature Foundation SA and Birds SA.
In 2014 the sanctuary was proclaimed a conservation park under the National Parks and Wildlife Act 1972, in order to 'provide one of the highest levels of protection allowed for by state legislation'.

Timeline 
The SA government committed to the proposal at the state election held in March 2014. The 2014–15 State Budget included expenditure of A$0.3 million for the purpose of commencing work.
The SA Government has also committed to an expenditure of A$1.7 million over a period of four years for the sanctuary's establishment and its ongoing maintenance, with a likely completion in 2018.

Land in the localities of Windsor, Dublin and Lower Light was proclaimed as a national park under the National Parks and Wildlife Act 1972 on 27 October 2016 with the name Adelaide International Bird Sanctuary National Park—Winaityinaityi Pangkara with Winaityinaityi Pangkara being the national park's name in the language of the Kaurna people, whose traditional lands include the Adelaide metropolitan area and the extent of the national park.

See also 
 Gulf St Vincent Important Bird Area
 List of protected areas in Adelaide
 East Asian–Australasian Flyway

Citations and references

Citations

References

External links 
Official webpage
The Adelaide International Bird Sanctuary- BirdLife Australia 1080p

National parks of South Australia
Protected areas in Adelaide
Gulf St Vincent
Bird sanctuaries
Eyre Yorke Block